Michael T. Marron is a Republican member of the Illinois House of Representatives from the 104th district. The 104th district includes parts of Champaign and Vermilion counties in east-central Illinois. Marron was sworn into office September 7, 2018 after his July 22, 2018 appointment to succeed Chad Hays. Marron, who was the Republican candidate to succeed Hays at the time of his appointment, won the 2018 general election against Democratic candidate Cynthia Cunningham.

Marron's committee assignments are the Committee on Community College Access & Affordability; the Committee on the Environment; and the Committee on Insurance Subcommittee on Property & Casualty.

On September 3, 2019, Marron announced he would explore a run for Illinois's 15th congressional district to succeed retiring Congressman John Shimkus, but shortly after opted to run for reelection to the Illinois House of Representatives.

As of July 3, 2022, Representative Marron is a member of the following Illinois House committees:

 Energy & Environment Committee (HENG)
 Firefighters and First Responders Subcommittee (SHPF-FIRE)
 Higher Education Committee (HHED)
 Housing Committee (SHOU)
 Law Enforcement Subcommittee (SHPF-LAWE)
 Police & Fire Committee (SHPF)
 Roadways, Rail & Aviation Subcommittee (HTRR-ROAD)
 Transportation: Regulation, Roads & Bridges Committee (HTRR)

Electoral history

References

External links
 Official profile from Illinois General Assembly
 Official campaign website

Living people
21st-century American politicians
Republican Party members of the Illinois House of Representatives
People from Vermilion County, Illinois
Farmers from Illinois
Year of birth missing (living people)